Moby Dick is a 1978 filmed one-man version of Herman Melville's classic 1851 novel Moby Dick.  The film starred Jack Aranson, a Shakespearean actor trained in the Old Vic, and was directed by Paul Stanley.

References

 Van Gelder, L. (1979, Jan 7). Moby Dick: A Test of Actor's Versatility. The New York Times. Retrieved from https://www.nytimes.com/1979/01/07/archives/new-jersey-weekly-moby-dick-a-test-of-actors-versatility.html

External links
 
 MobyDickDVD.com

1978 films
1970s disaster films
1978 drama films
American disaster films
American drama films
Films based on Moby-Dick
American films about revenge
One-character films
Films directed by Paul Stanley (director)
1970s English-language films
1970s American films